Pîrliţa may refer to several places in Moldova:

Pîrliţa, Făleşti, a commune in Fălești District
Pîrliţa, Soroca, a commune in Soroca District
Pîrliţa, Ungheni, a commune in Ungheni District

See also 
 Pârlita (disambiguation)